The Chief of Staff of the Navy or Admiral Chief of Staff of the Navy (AJEMA) is the highest-ranking military officer of the Spanish Navy that, under the authority of the Defence Minister, exercises command over the naval branch and, as such, is the principal military advisor to the Chief of the Defence Staff, the Minister of Defence, the Secretary of State for Defence, the Under-Secretary of Defence and the National Defence Council.

The JEMA has two main roles: the support role by which advice the Minister of Defence about the naval military policy, the JEMAD about how to use the personnel and their operative status, the SEDEF about the economic, armamentistic and infraestructure policies and the SUBDEF about the personnel and teaching policy and the operative role by which prepare the force for combat, instructs the military personnel, establishes the organization of its military branch and watches over the welfare of the personnel under his command and evaluates the needs of the Navy.

The AJEMA calls the meetings and coordinates the efforts of the Naval Staff (EMA), the main auxiliary body of the AJEMA, which assists him in the exercise of its competences and in the responsibilities assigned to it over the organization of the Navy, preparation of the troops and administration of the assigned resources. The EMA has a whole body of military officers at its service, and among the main officers include the Second Admiral Chief of Staff of the Navy, the Admiral of the Fleet (ALFLOT), the Admiral of Naval Action (ALNAV), the Admiral of Maritime Action (ALMART), the General Commander of the Marines (COMGEIM), the Commander of the Naval Air Fleet (COMFLOAN) and the General Commander of the Submarines Fleet (COMSUBMAR).

The position is currently held by Admiral General Antonio Martorell Lacave since February 10, 2021.

History
The position of AJEMA was created on July 13, 1895 at the same time as the Naval Staff, which replaced the position of Under Secretary of the Navy. The office was reserved for officers with a minimum position of Rear admiral (Contraalmirante).

By Royal decree of March 30, 1899, the Undersecretary of the Navy  was re-created and assumed the competences of the Military Secretariat and the Naval Staff, passing its owner to be called Under secretary of the Navy and Chief of the Central Naval Staff. The AJEMA position finally disappeared in 1900.

In December 1902, the Central Staff of the Navy (EMCA) was created, whose top official was once again a Chief under the name Chief of the Central Naval Staff. It was abolished again in August 1903. By the Law of 7 January 1908, which reforms the Institutes, agencies and services of the Navy, the EMCA was once again created. The AJEMA was granted the chair of the Board that informed the Minister of the Navy of naval matters, except if he did not possess the rank of Vice Admiral, which was then chaired by the Vice Admiral Chief of the Central Jurisdiction of the Navy and the AJEMA acted as a member. This law was developed by the Regulation of January 17, which limited this position to officers of the rank of Vice Admiral or Rear Admiral.

On October 20, 1927, the EMCA is replaced by the Directorate-General of Campaign and Services of the Naval Staff (DGCSEM) in front of which there was a Vice Admiral with the title of Director-General of the same body. On October 15, 1930, the DGCSEM is suppressed, the Naval Staff (EMA) is created again and with it, Chief of Staff of the navy (on which the Naval War College directly depended), although it will not be until December 1930 that the name of the Director-General passes to that of AJEMA.

During the Civil War, each side of the conflict established its own Naval Staff. While the rebellious side maintained the Naval Staff, the Republican side had mainly the Marine Staff, although briefly the Central Staff of the Naval Forces of the Republic was created afterwards.

After the end of the civil war, the Francoism divided again the ministries destined to the defense in three, one for each army branch and maintained the Naval Staff that is maintained until today with the Chief or Admiral Chief of Staff of the Navy in front.

List

(*) Promoted posthumously to Admiral General in 1999. (**) Promoted to Admiral General ad honorem in 1999. (***) Promoted to Admiral General while in office.

See also
 Chief of the Defence Staff
 Ministers of Defence
 Captain general of the Navy
 Spanish Navy
 Chief of Staff of the Army
 Chief of Staff of the Air Force

Notes

References

Military of Spain
Spain